"Too Bad" is a song by Canadian rock band Nickelback, released on November 27, 2001, as the second single from their third studio album, Silver Side Up (2001). The song reached number 42 on the US Billboard Hot 100 Chart, number one on the Billboard Mainstream Rock Tracks Chart, and peaked within the top 20 in Ireland, the Netherlands, and the United Kingdom.

Lyrical content
The lyrics were written by the band's singer and guitarist Chad Kroeger and deals with the issues he felt growing up without his father, who abandoned him at age two.

Music video
A music video was made for the song showing the band playing in the "Woodley Sawmill". A picture of the father and his son standing next to a truck is shown. After receiving a foreclosure notice, the father leaves his family and his son seems to be the most impacted. After years pass, he and his mother get into a fight ending with him leaving. He speeds down a dirt road where several flashbacks appear and distracted he crashes into a wooden post, breaking his leg. The music stops for a moment when his father receives a phone call telling him about the accident, then starts again. He is brought back to his house, where he sees his father sitting at the table, and the two walk out to the father's truck. The song ends with the picture shown at the beginning of the video shown again.

Track listings

UK CD single
 "Too Bad" (Diggla mix)
 "Never Again" (live)
 "Leader of Men" (live)
 "Too Bad" (live video)

UK cassette single
 "Too Bad" (Diggla mix) – 3:29
 "How You Remind Me" (live) – 5:48

European CD single 1
 "Too Bad" (Diggla mix) – 3:29
 "Woke Up This Morning" (live) – 3:49
 "How You Remind Me" (live) – 5:48
 "Too Bad" (video)

European CD single 2
 "Too Bad" (Diggla mix) – 3:29
 "Yanking Out My..." – 3:34
 "Too Bad" (video)

European maxi-CD single
 "Too Bad" (Diggla mix) – 3:29
 "Yanking Out My..." – 3:34
 "Learn the Hard Way" – 2:54
 "Too Bad" (video)

Australian maxi-CD single
 "Too Bad" – 3:51
 "How You Remind Me" (Cold Live at the Chapel) – 4:15
 "Learn the Hard Way" – 2:54

Personnel
Personnel are lifted from the UK CD single liner notes.
 Chad Kroeger – lead vocals, guitars
 Ryan Peake – guitars, vocals
 Mike Kroeger – bass
 Ryan Vikedal – drums

Charts

Weekly charts

Year-end charts

Certifications

Release history

References

Nickelback songs
2001 singles
2001 songs
Song recordings produced by Rick Parashar
Songs about parenthood
Songs written by Chad Kroeger
Songs written by Mike Kroeger
Songs written by Ryan Peake